Naattupura Paattu is a 1996 Tamil language drama film written and directed by Kasthuri Raja. The film stars Sivakumar, Selva, and Khushbu, with Manorama, Goundamani, Senthil, Vinu Chakravarthy, Kumarimuthu, Prem, Anusha and Abhirami playing supporting roles. It was released on 9 February 1996. It was a surprise hit at the box office.

Plot
Parijatham was a famous folk dancer in her village and many rich landlords tried to woo her. Parijatham's mother Pattamma wanted a son-in-law who will let Parijatham dance after the marriage. She finally married another folk dancer Palanisamy. Palanisamy's brother Kottaisamy was a young wastrel who spent his time with Kattamuthu. Later, Parijatham changed Kottaisamy into a responsible person. Kottaisamy married the folk dancer Mala. Rumours around Parijatham and the rich landlord Naicker became more intense. Palanisamy could not bear this rumour and split up with the pregnant Parijatham. One day, Kattamuthu's sister was raped by a rich landlord, she then committed suicide and Kottaisamy ridiculed the rapist in public. After this incident, the rapist joined forces with the other landlords, they prevented Kottaisamy to dance for the village festival. So Kottaisamy and Mala struggled to survive, Mala eventually died during a dance show and Kottaisamy became a drunkard. In the meantime, Palanisamy brought up alone his baby son and Parijatham had to stop dancing.

Many years later, Palanisamy's son Velpandi falls in love with Amaravathi. Palanisamy finally apologizes to his wife Parijatham while Kottaisamy decides to take revenge on his enemies. What transpires next forms the rest of the story.

Cast

Sivakumar as Palanisamy
Selva as Kottaisamy
Khushbu as Parijatham
Manorama as Pattamma
Goundamani as Kattamuthu
Senthil as Chinna Karuppan
Vinu Chakravarthy as Naicker
Kumarimuthu as Pattamma's father
Prem as Velpandi
Anusha as Amaravathi
Abhirami as Mala
Charle
Jai Ganesh
Shanmugasundaram
Anwar Ali Khan as Minor
Taj Khan
Venkat
Idichapuli Selvaraj
Karuppu Subbiah
Periya Karuppu Thevar
John Babu as dancer in song "Otha Roova"

Production
Kasthuri Raja revealed that when he first started the film he had no script except the title. The struggles of folk artists in Theni formed the basis for the script.

Soundtrack

The film score and the soundtrack were composed by Ilaiyaraaja. The soundtrack, released in 1996, features 6 tracks with lyrics written by the director himself. The song "Otharoova" was well received and became a chartbuster.

References

1996 films
Indian drama films
1990s Tamil-language films
Films scored by Ilaiyaraaja
Films directed by Kasthuri Raja